Cuidado con el ángel is a Mexican telenovela produced by Televisa and originally transmitted by Telesistema Mexicano.

Amparo Rivelles, Guillermo Aguilar, and Ofelia Guilmáin starred as protagonists.

Cast 
 Amparo Rivelles
 Guillermo Aguilar
 Ofelia Guilmáin
 Héctor Gómez
 Rosenda Monteros
 Arcelia Larrañaga
 Anita Blanch

References 

Mexican telenovelas
Televisa telenovelas
1959 telenovelas
1959 Mexican television series debuts
1959 Mexican television series endings
Spanish-language telenovelas